The Simplon Tunnel (Simplontunnel, Traforo del Sempione or Galleria del Sempione) is a railway tunnel on the Simplon railway that connects Brig, Switzerland and Domodossola, Italy, through the Alps, providing a shortcut under the Simplon Pass route. It is straight except for short curves at either end. It consists of two single-track tunnels built nearly 15 years apart.

Temperatures up to  have been measured inside the tunnel.

Work on the first tube of the Simplon Tunnel commenced in 1898. The Italian king Victor Emmanuel III of Italy and the president of the Swiss Confederation (presiding the Federal Council of Switzerland for that year) Ludwig Forrer opened the tunnel at Brig on 10 May 1906. The builders of the tunnel were Hermann Häustler and Hugo von Kager. Work on the second tube of the tunnel started in 1912 and it was opened in 1921.

History 

Shortly after the opening of the first railway in Switzerland, each region began to favour a separate north–south link through the Alps towards Italy. Eastern Switzerland supported a line through the Splügen Pass or the Lukmanier Pass, Central Switzerland and Zürich favoured the Gotthard Pass and Western Switzerland supported the Simplon route.

In 1871 the first line was completed through the Alps, connecting Italy and France with the Fréjus Rail Tunnel.

The Compagnie de la Ligne d'Italie was founded in 1856 to build a connection between Romandy and Italy through the Canton of Valais and the Simplon. On 1 June 1874, it was taken over by the Simplon Company (French: Compagnie du Simplon, S), which was created to promote the project. This merged in 1881 with the company Western Swiss Railways (French: Chemins de Fer de la Suisse Occidentale, SO) to create the Western Switzerland–Simplon Company (French: Compagnie de la Suisse Occidentale et du Simplon, SOS). The French financiers of the SOS were able to secure finance for the tunnel in 1886. The company considered 31 proposals and selected one that involved the construction of a tunnel from Glis to Gondo, which would have been fully in Switzerland. From Gondo it would have continued on a ramp through the Divedro valley down to Domodossola.

At a Swiss-Italian conference held in July 1889, it was agreed, however, to build a nearly  base tunnel through the territory of both states. In order to secure credit for the tunnel, the SOS joined with the Jura–Bern–Luzern Railway to create the Jura–Simplon Railway (French: Compagnie du Jura–Simplon, SOS).

The participation of the Swiss government led to the signing of a treaty with Italy on 25 November 1895 concerning the construction and operation of a railway through the Simplon from Brig to Domodossola by the Jura–Simplon Railway. The route of the tunnel was determined by military considerations so that the state border between the two countries was in the middle of the tunnel, allowing either country to block the tunnel in the event of war.

On 1 May 1903, the Jura-Simplon Railway was nationalized and integrated into the network of the Swiss Federal Railways (SBB), which completed the construction of the tunnel.

Construction 

On average, 3,000 people a day worked on the site. They were mostly Italians, who suffered under very poor working conditions: 67 workers were killed in accidents; many died later of diseases. During the work, there were strikes, which led to the intervention of vigilantes and the Swiss army.

It was envisaged that the parallel tunnel could be upgraded to a second running tunnel when required. The first Simplon Tunnel ( in length) was built almost straight, with only short curves at the two tunnel portals.

On 24 February 1905, the two halves of the tunnel came together. They were out of alignment by only  horizontally and  vertically. Construction time was  years, rather than  years, due to problems such as water inflows and strikes.

Electrification and operation 

Operations commenced through the tunnel on 19 May 1906. Because of its length among other things, it has operated with electric traction rather than steam from the beginning. The official decision to use electricity was made only half a year before its opening by the then-still-new SBB. Brown, Boveri & Cie (BBC) were commissioned to carry out the electrification. They decided in 1904 to use the three-phase system being introduced in Italy, with a three-phase power supply of 3,400 volts at 15.8 Hz using two overhead wires with the track acting as the third conductor. BBC had no electric locomotives and initially acquired three locomotives built for the Ferrovia della Valtellina—the owner of the lines from Colico to Chiavenna and Tirano, which had been electrified with this system in 1901 and 1902—from their owner, the Rete Adriatica (Adriatic Network) railway company. These three locomotives (which became FS Class E.360) hauled all traffic through the tunnel until 1908. On 2 March 1930, the Simplon tunnel was converted to 15 kV, 16.7 Hz AC (single-phase).

Expansion 
Between 1912 and 1921, the  second tube, known as Simplon II, was built. On 7 January 1922 the northern section from the north portal to the  passing loop in the middle of the tunnel was brought into operation, followed on 16 October 1922 by the southern section from the passing loop to the south portal.

Second World War 
During the Second World War, on both sides of the border, there were preparations for the possible detonation of the tunnels. The explosives attached to the tunnel on the Swiss section were not removed until 2001. In Italy, the German army planned, as part of its 1945 withdrawal, to blow up the tunnel, but was thwarted by Italian partisans with the help of two Swiss officials and Austrian deserters.

Present and future

Car-carrying shuttle trains 

There is a car-carrying shuttle between Brig and Iselle di Trasquera, which provides a 20-minute train journey as an alternative to driving over the Simplon Pass. The service began on 1 December 1959. As roads over the Simplon Pass steadily improved throughout the 1970s and 1980s the tunnel's shuttle schedule was cut back, then ended altogether on 3 January 1993. Almost twelve years later, on 12 December 2004, the car shuttle service began again and now runs about every 90 minutes.

Piggyback transport 
In the early 1990s, a project to implement the rolling highway system of piggyback operations for transalpine freight on the Lötschberg–Simplon axis was implemented. The clearance in the tunnel was therefore increased by lowering the rail trackbed. This work began in 1995 and lasted eight years. At the same time, the tunnel vault was rehabilitated, while the drainage tunnel was rebuilt.

In addition, a new railway electrification system was installed using overhead electric rail instead of the tensioned cable normally used for overhead electrification so that the required  height clearance could be achieved.

Restricted rail operations were maintained during the entire construction period.

Expansion of access routes 
In order to expand the Lötschberg-Simplon axis into a powerful transit axis, various extensions to the access lines (from Bern and Lausanne in the north and from Novara and Milan in the south) have been made in recent years and decades. The largest projects have dealt with the northern access from Basel-Bern via Lötschberg. Between 1976 and 2007 there were three major transformations. First, the remaining single-track line between Spiez and Brig was dualled. Later, adjustments were made to the tunnel profile for piggyback traffic; in places only widening one track was possible. Finally, the Lötschberg Base Tunnel partially opened in 2007, although the new tunnel still has a 21-kilometre (13 mile) single-track section; this was done in order to save costs for the construction of the longer Gotthard Base Tunnel, which was completed in 2016.

Clearances were also raised for the piggyback traffic on the Italian side as well on the Simplon southern approach. Here, too, for financial reasons, at times only one line was cleared for the rolling highway. South of Domodossola, the single line to Novara via Lake Orta was electrified and modernized.

The classic approach to the Simplon from Paris and Lausanne—less important for today's transit traffic—was upgraded in the context of a nationwide rail upgrading project, Rail 2000, between 1985 and 2004. Further adjustments are proposed. In November 2004, the  new line between Salgesch and Leuk in the Rhone Valley was completed to replace the last single-track bottleneck on the route.

2011 fire 
On 9 June 2011, a  section of the Simplon II tunnel's roof was seriously damaged when a northbound BLS freight train caught fire and stopped  into the tunnel.  The temperature exceeded  and took more than two weeks to cool back to normal. By agreement all repairs to the tunnels are the responsibility of the SBB, which expected to reopen the tunnel in December 2011.  The other tunnel remained in service.

Repair work was completed in November 2011.

Facts and figures 
Length of tunnel I: 
Length of tunnel II: 
Elevation at north portal, Brig: 
Elevation at crest of the tunnel: 
Elevation at south portal, Iselle: 
Gradient on north side: 2 ‰
Gradient on south side: 7 ‰ (1 in 143)
Maximum rock overlay:  (below the Tunnelspitz of the Wasenhorn massif)
Start of construction on north side: 22 November 1898
Start of construction of south side: 21 December 1898
Breakthrough: 24 February 1905
Inauguration: 19 May 1906
First electrical operation: 1 June 1906

Spiral tunnel 
On the rail line north from Domodossola prior to the Simplon tunnels is the  "Varzo Spiral Tunnel", probably the longest spiral tunnel in the world. See the route diagram at the start of this subject.

In popular media 
In the 1957 novel From Russia, with Love by Ian Fleming, protagonist James Bond fights his enemy, SMERSH agent Donovan Grant, eventually killing him, while passing through the Simplon Tunnel on the Orient Express.

In Against the Day by Thomas Pynchon, Reef Traverse works on the Simplon Tunnel.

Notes

References 
Michel Delaloye (Hrsg.): Simplon, histoire, géologie, minéralogie. Ed. Fondation Bernard et Suzanne Tissières, Martigny 2005.  (in German)
Frank Garbely: Bau des Simplontunnels. Die Streiks! Unia, Oberwallis 2006 (in German)
Thomas Köppel, Stefan Haas (Hrsg.): Simplon – 100 Jahre Simplontunnel. AS-Verlag, Zürich 2006. 
Wolfgang Mock: Simplon. Tisch 7 Verlagsgesellschaft, Köln 2005.  (in German)
M. Rosenmund: Über die Anlage des Simplontunnels und dessen Absteckung, in: Jahresberichte der Geographisch-Ethnographischen Gesellschaft in Zürich, Band Band 5 (1904–1905), S. 71ff. (Digitalisat) (in German)
Hansrudolf Schwabe, Alex Amstein: 3 x 50 Jahre. Schweizer Eisenbahnen in Vergangenheit, Gegenwart und Zukunft. Pharos-Verlag, Basel 1997.  (in German)
Georges Tscherrig: 100 Jahre Simplontunnel. 2. Auflage. Rotten, Visp 2006.  (in German)
Enzyklopädie des Eisenbahnwesens. Bd 9. Urban & Schwarzenberg, Berlin 1921 Directmedia Publishing, Berlin 2007 (Repr.), S. 68–72.  (in German)

External links 

 Francis Fox, How the Swiss Built the Greatest Tunnel in the World, 1905
 German language site:  AlpenTunnel.de: Simplon-Tunnel
  description of the construction of the tunnel

Railway tunnels in Switzerland
Railway tunnels in Italy
Transport in Piedmont
Italy–Switzerland border crossings
Buildings and structures in Valais
Railways using three-phase power
Tunnels completed in 1906
1906 in Italy
Tunnels in the Alps
International tunnels